In enzymology, a ADP-ribosyl cyclase/cyclic ADP-ribose hydrolase is a bifunctional enzyme that catalyzes the chemical reaction

NAD+ + H2O  cADPR + H2O + nicotinamide  ADP-ribose + nicotinamide

The 3 substrates of this enzyme are NAD+ and H2O, whereas its two products are ADP-ribose and nicotinamide. The reaction proceeds through cyclic ADP-ribose (cADPR) as intermediate, which is then hydrolyzed into ADP-ribose. This makes it different from NAD+ glycohydrolase (EC 3.2.2.5), where the reaction does not proceed through cADPR.

This enzyme belongs to the family of hydrolases, specifically those glycosylases that hydrolyse N-glycosyl compounds. Other names of this enzyme in common use include nicotinamide adenine dinucleotide (phosphate) nucleosidase, triphosphopyridine nucleotidase, NAD(P) nucleosidase, NAD(P)ase, and nicotinamide adenine dinucleotide (phosphate) glycohydrolase.  This enzyme participates in nicotinate and nicotinamide metabolism.

References

 
 
 

EC 3.2.2
NADPH-dependent enzymes
NADH-dependent enzymes
Enzymes of unknown structure